The speaker of the Amyotha Hluttaw is the presiding officer or Speaker of the Amyotha Hluttaw.

List of speakers of the House of Nationalities

List of deputy speaker of House of Nationalities

References

Lists of office-holders
Legislatures of Myanmar
Chairs of upper houses